Feel the Beat is a 2020 American family dance comedy-drama film directed by Elissa Down, written by Michael Armbruster and Shawn Ku and starring Sofia Carson, Enrico Colantoni and Wolfgang Novogratz.

Plot 
April Dibrina, a young dancer seeking success on Broadway, steals a cab from an old lady during a rainstorm to get to an audition. She performs well, but sponsor Ruth Zimmer, meets the potential dancers. When she recognizes April (from the taxi incident), she vows that no one on Broadway will hire her. While trying to explain, she accidentally knocks Ruth off stage, inflicting serious injury. It is posted on social media, publicly embarrassing April.

Evicted, April returns to her hometown in Wisconsin. While at the grocery store, she bumps into the New Hope dance teacher Miss Barb, who invites her to come to the dance studio. April also sees her ex Nick, whom she left to pursue a career in New York City.

In the dance studio, she visits the class of dancers: Lucia, a forgetful girl with glasses; Oona, a nervous girl; Kari, who secretly earns her own classes; Ruby, with no self-confidence; Zuzu, a deaf girl; Sarah, Nick’s stubborn little sister; and June and Michelle, the youngest. Zuzu’s little brother, Dicky, also watches.

Barb asks April to coach the town's dance team for a competition. At first, she declines, but later realizes it can give her a chance to perform in front of Welly Wong, saving her career. April accepts, beginning a harsh training regimen that alienates the young dancers, including causing Ruby to quit.

The New Hope dance team advances through several rounds of the competition; they improve as April bonds with them, becoming a better teacher, including learning some sign language to communicate with Zuzu. One day, the dance studio ceiling collapses after April tells the dancers they "don't suck," so they know they are improving. Unable to afford repairs to the studio, the team moves practice to the football field and eventually move to April's father's barn, which Nick has helped repair.

April and Nick begin to rekindle their relationship as the dance team advances to state. Dancers from another troupe taunt her about her failure in New York, causing her to lose focus during one dance, though she recovers.

In the mini’s 6-and-under category, the two youngest dancers, June and Michelle, are struck with stage fright. Dicky, who has memorized all the girl's choreography while they practiced, runs out and starts to dance. June and Michelle recover, and they all dance together. Dicky now trains with the dance troupe.

After passing state finals, April calls her NYC friend Deco to help make costumes. One day, as the small dancers are rehearsing a lift in the barn, April calls on Sarah and R.J., the football player whom Sarah has a crush and she wants to impress, to demonstrate. When R.J. lifts her, her silicone bra cup falls on the floor, and she runs off, embarrassed and crying. April finds her in the field and comforts her.

The dancers' families raise the money to send the team to Atlantic City for the finals. April reconnects with Nick's younger sister Sarah, who had felt abandoned when her mother died and April moved to New York. Once in Atlantic City, after a performance, Welly Wong is so impressed with April he offers her the lead in his new show on the spot. April and Welly leave the competition immediately for rehearsal in NYC, devastating the team.

The next day, April realizes her mistake and abandons the rehearsal, proclaiming to Welly that she must honor her commitment to New Hope. She calls Deco again to drive her back to Atlantic City just in time to encourage the team before the performance. After reconciling with her dancers, April and Nick kiss, and Welly keeps her on despite leaving rehearsal.

April performs in Welly Wong's show in NYC and continues teaching her dance class in Wisconsin via video chat. On opening night, Welly surprises April by bringing the New Hope team over for a dance party. Everyone dances in the street, and Ruth Zimmer drives by momentarily, appalled.

Cast

Release
Feel the Beat was released on June 19, 2020.

Reception

Soundtrack 
"Let's Do It" - All Talk
"Work Dat (So Dat)" - Kylie Diehl
"Hand of Man" - Country Joe & The Fish
"Round and Round" - Jack Hawitt
"Brand New Day" - Kari Kimmel
"Never Forgive You" - Brooke Villanyi
"Wish You Was Me" - Lauren Evans
"Glitter Shoes" - Blaire Reinhard
"Confident" - Demi Lovato
"Us" - Regina Spektor
"Deal With It" - Girli
"Pumpin Blood" - NoNoNo
"Yes or Yes" - Tricia Battani
"I'm Gonna Do My Thing (Hey Hey)" - Mozella
"Like That" - Fleur East
"Colors" - Wayfarers
"Follow the Leader" - Wayfarers
"Winner Won't Stop" - Neara Russell
"Always" (Acoustic) - Francois Klark
"A Little More" - Alessia Cara
"Gonna Make You Sweat (Everybody Dance Now)" - C+C Music Factory
"All I Wanna Do Is Dance" - Mozella
"Always" - Sofia Carson

See also

List of films featuring the deaf and hard of hearing

References

External links
 
 

2020 films
American comedy-drama films
American dance films
Films about dance competitions
Films about deaf people
Films set in Atlantic City, New Jersey
Films set in New York City
Films set in Wisconsin
Films shot in Toronto
English-language Netflix original films
Films scored by Michael Yezerski
2020s English-language films
Films directed by Elissa Down
2020s American films
Films about disability